Taja Mohorčič (born 24 April 1989) is a retired Slovenian tennis player. On 25 February 2008, Mohorčič reached her best singles ranking of world number 957. On 26 November 2007, she peaked at world number 733 in the doubles rankings.

Mohorčič made her WTA tour debut at the 2007 Banka Koper Slovenia Open, partnering Petra Pajalič in doubles. The pair lost their first round match against Sybille Bammer and Polona Hercog.

ITF finals (0–2)

Doubles (0–2)

References

External links 
 
 

1989 births
Living people
Slovenian female tennis players